The 2016 Women's Junior South American Volleyball Championship was the 23rd edition of the tournament, organised by South America's governing volleyball body, the Confederación Sudamericana de Voleibol (CSV). The champion will qualify for the 2017 Junior World Championship.

Competing nations
The following national teams will participate in the tournament:

Competition format
The championship consisted of a single Round-Robin pool between the six teams, the champion was  determined from the ranking after the round.

Competition

All times are Brasilia Standard Time (UTC-3)

|}

 

 

 
 
 
 
 
 
 
 
 
 
|}

Final standing

Awards
Players who received individual awards:

Most Valuable Player

Best Setter

Best Outside Hitters

Best Opposite

Best Middle Blockers

Best Libero

References

External links
CSV official website

Women's South American Volleyball Championships
S
Volleyball
V
Youth volleyball